Ankara Anatolian High School is a high school that began as a lycée in 1981. The medium of instruction was German and French until the education year 2012-13. The medium of instruction was converted to English since 2012-13.

References 

Education in Ankara